Patrick Richard Daley (born June 10, 1975) is an American businessman. He is the son of the former mayor of Chicago, Richard M. Daley. Daley and his father are partners in a Chicago-based investment firm.

Early life and education
Patrick Daley is the son of politician Richard M. Daley and Margaret "Maggie" Corbett Daley. He attended Mount Carmel High School in Chicago. At age 18, Daley enrolled as a cadet in the United States Military Academy at West Point, New York, having been nominated to the academy by U.S. Representative Bill Lipinski. He left West Point during his first year. In 2004, he received an MBA from the University of Chicago. Later that year, the 29-year-old Daley decided to enlist in the Army's regular airborne infantry rather than enter service through officer's training.

Brawl at Daley home in Michigan 
On the weekend of March 1–2, 1992, Mayor Daley and wife Maggie attended a family party in New York, and 16-year-old Patrick was to stay with relatives. Patrick told the relatives he was staying with friends and drove his father's new sports utility vehicle to the Daley second home in Grand Beach, Michigan and threw a party Saturday night. Patrick fetched former Chicago Mayor Richard J. Daley's 20-gauge double-barrel shotgun from the Daley home and handed it to his cousin, R. J. Vanecko, 17. Vanecko aimed the shotgun at teenagers, pulled the trigger twice and yelled that he was not afraid to use the weapon. A youth threw a concrete goose lawn ornament through the windshield of Mayor Daley's truck, and Patrick punched him. A youth was seriously injured when struck in the head with a baseball bat wielded by a juvenile, was hospitalized in critical condition, underwent surgery to remove a blood clot on his brain and spent three days in intensive care.

On Monday, Mayor Daley held a press conference in which he sobbed while reading a statement that said: "I am very disappointed, as any parent would be, after his son held a party in their home while his parents were away. I am more deeply distressed for the welfare of the young man who was injured in this fight."

Police questioned 32 youths about the incident. Patrick pleaded guilty to misdemeanor charges of furnishing alcohol to minors and disturbing the peace. He was sentenced to six months' probation, 50 hours of community service in Grand Beach, and a fine of $1,950. He was also required to pay restitution to his parents for property damage. Vanecko pleaded guilty to aiming a firearm without malice and was fined $1,235. 16 other youths were charged with juvenile and adult offenses. The injured youth recovered. A Mount Carmel High School classmate of Patrick's was convicted of aggravated assault in the beating.

Controversies

Sewer-inspection contract 
Patrick was an MBA student at the University of Chicago's Business School, working as an unpaid intern at Cardinal Growth, a Chicago venture capital firm. In June 2003, Patrick and his cousin Vanecko formed a Delaware company MSS Investors LLC and invested $65,000 each to acquire a 5% stake in Municipal Sewer Services, a Cardinal Growth venture. Months later, Municipal Sewer Services was awarded a $3 million, no-bid sewer inspection contract extension from the City of Chicago, and, later, two further extensions worth an additional $4 million. Daley's and Venecko's ownership was deliberately omitted from the ethics disclosures required of City contractors.

The day after Patrick Daley's and Robert Vanecko's hidden involvement in a city contract was disclosed in the Chicago Sun-Times, Mayor Daley stated, "I did not know about [Patrick's] involvement in this company." Mayor Daley also said he didn't know if there are other city contracts involving the younger Daley. A Chicago Tribune editorial asked, "Who omitted the names of the clout cousins when Municipal Sewer Services filed its disclosure statements? Who at City Hall tapped the company for no-bid work? Were the cousins involved in any other ventures doing business with the city?" 

The city's inspector general and federal authorities began investigations in December 2007. Patrick Daley and Robert Vanecko hired criminal defense attorneys. Municipal Sewer Services LLC folded in April 2008. In January 2011, the president of Municipal Sewer Services, was charged with three counts of mail fraud in conjunction with minority contracting, and later pleaded guilty and was sentenced to 17 months in prison. Jesse Brunt and his company, Brunt Brothers Transfer Inc., was also indicted on three counts of mail fraud. Patrick Daley and Vanecko were not charged with any crime.

Airport Wi-Fi deal 
In 2005, Concourse Communications, another Cardinal Growth venture, signed a potentially lucrative city contract for airport Wi-Fi service at city-owned O'Hare Airport and Midway Airport. Concourse disclosed its investors to the city, as required, and Daley was not listed. On June 27, 2006, nine months after it signed the contract, Concourse was sold, at a 33% profit, to Boingo Wireless Inc. for $45 million. Over the next 17 months, Daley received five payments from Concourse totaling $544,210, for a total of $708,999. "...[T]he conflict of interest was blatant...all the laws in the world can't deter one truly single-minded schemer," the Chicago Sun-Times editorialized. In February, 2010 Daley lived in Moscow between deployments. In June 2011, United States Attorney Patrick Fitzgerald filed suit on behalf of the Small Business Administration to recover $21.4 million of a $51 million small business loan Cardinal Growth had borrowed but was unable to repay, and Cardinal Growth agreed to be liquidated. No criminal indictments have been handed down for Daley's involvement.

References

External links 
Patrick Daley archive at the Chicago Tribune

1975 births
Living people
Businesspeople from Chicago
University of Chicago alumni
United States Military Academy alumni
Military personnel from Illinois
American people of Irish descent
Daley family